Carlos Rafael Casimiro (born November 8, 1976) is a former Major League Baseball player who played with the Baltimore Orioles in 2000. In 2014, he began managing the Dominican Summer League Athletics in the Oakland Athletics system.

External links

1976 births
Living people
Baltimore Orioles players
Bluefield Orioles players
Bowie Baysox players
Delmarva Shorebirds players
Dominican Republic expatriate baseball players in Italy
Dominican Republic expatriate baseball players in the United States
Expatriate baseball players in San Marino
Frederick Keys players

Major League Baseball designated hitters
Major League Baseball players from the Dominican Republic
Sportspeople from San Pedro de Macorís
Rochester Red Wings players
T & A San Marino players